The Northern Star is a daily newspaper serving Lismore, New South Wales, Australia. The newspaper is owned by News Corp Australia.

The Northern Star is circulated to Lismore and surrounding communities, from Tweed Heads to the north, to Kyogle and Casino to the west and Evans Head to the south and includes the seaside towns of Byron Bay and Ballina.

The circulation of The Northern Star is 14,737 Monday to Friday and 22,653 on Saturday. The Northern Star website is part of the APN Regional News Network.

History
The two-page first issue of The Northern Star was brought out on 13 May 1876, on the tiny Albion hand press that today holds pride of place in the foyer of the Goonellabah Media Centre. In 1955, building started on the media centre in Goonellabah, and in 1957, the move was made from the Molesworth St office.

In 1981, The Northern Star commissioned a 7unit Goss Urbanite Web Offset press capable of printing 20,000 fifty-six page copies – 1.12 million pages an hour.

In 2004, the press was upgraded to twelve units with six Enkel auto reel stands, increasing the capability to 3.2 million pages an hour or 53,333 pages a minute. Colour capacity also increased from 16 to 48 pages of processed colour in one pass.

Along with many other regional Australian newspapers owned by NewsCorp, the newspaper ceased print editions in June 2020 and became online-only publication.

Digitisation
The paper has been digitised as part of the Australian Newspapers Digitisation Program project of the National Library of Australia.

See also
List of newspapers in Australia
List of newspapers in New South Wales

References

External links
 
 

Lismore, New South Wales
Newspapers published in New South Wales
Publications established in 1876
APN Australian Regional Media
Daily newspapers published in Australia
Newspapers on Trove